Nizhny Dzhalgan (Aşağı-Calğan) is a rural locality (a selo) in Khazarsky Selsoviet, Derbentsky District, Republic of Dagestan, Russia. The population was 2,841 as of 2010. There are 44 streets.

Geography 
Nizhny Dzhalgan is located 9 km south of Derbent (the district's administrative centre) by road. Vavilovo, Khazar and Arablinskoye are the nearest rural localities.

Nationalities 
Azerbaijanis and Tabasarans live there.

References 

Rural localities in Derbentsky District